Breakpoint was a German demoscene party. From 2003 to 2010, it took place annually at Easter in Bingen.

Breakpoint was the successor to the legendary Mekka & Symposium. With over 1000 visitors, it was the world's biggest pure demoscene-party, attracting demosceners from not only Germany, but also from other European countries (e.g. Sweden, Finland, Poland, Spain), or even from overseas (for example Australia, Canada). The party was also the traditional host of the Scene.org Awards ceremony.

History
The concept of Breakpoint was born in late 2002 when internal tensions within the Mekka & Symposium organizing team made another M&S party impossible. Part of the remaining organizing team teamed up with organizers of other German demo parties like Dialogos, Evoke and the Ultimate Meeting, and decided to create a new demoscene party for Easter. The location was changed, from the northern city of Fallingbostel to Bingen, a small town near Frankfurt. The party place was decided to be an abandoned military depot out at the city borders.

Breakpoint 2003 proved to be an unmatched success among demosceners who attended. Both veterans and newcomers applauded the party's incredible atmosphere and almost literally unlimited freedom, often designated by a large (often 25–30-feet tall) bonfire. (The nearest residents lived kilometers away from the party, thus noise pollution and the general rowdiness was never an issue.) Criticisms of the party were minor, but pointed out that due to the failure of one of the heating pipes, the party hall became freezing during the night - this was actually parodied in various demos released there, entitling the party "Freezepoint".

Breakpoint 2004 saw a major change in the funding of the party: ATI Technologies became the main sponsor of the event, and apart from the lucrative prizes, offered various other events such as seminars and workshops. Also, ATI was sponsoring a helicopter flight for willing visitors over the hills of the Rhine-region. The sponsorship remained constant until 2006. The party was an inarguable success, although not as buoyant as its precursor, especially considering that the heating issues from the year before turned out to be unsolvable due to the structure of the hall which served as a party hall — this caused the party to be even colder than the previous year.

Breakpoint 2005 caused some sad moments to the demoscene when it was announced that the military depot was scheduled for condemnation by the German government, and the next edition was scheduled to be held in the city's gym in the middle of Bingen. A part of the visitors feared that the degrees of liberty which made Breakpoint so popular will be lost at the new location, including the symbolic bonfire. They were, however, proven wrong when the party turned out to be what most people stated as "the best demoparty ever". The limited nature of freedom was proven to be enough for sceners to use the surrounding outdoors area as a chillout zone, even having a bonfire (although not as grandiose as in previous years). The new location also provided a solution to the heating problem. The floors inside were covered by the organizers by a layer of carpet so visitors were even able to walk barefoot or sleep on the floor. (Some visitors even joked about spending the night outdoors to get the "good old Breakpoint freeze-to-death-feeling".) The party's atmosphere was improved with both seminars for the interested and 4 live concerts of bands playing demoscene music live. The competitions also featured high quality releases and the event was voted as the "Best Alltime Demoparty" in the PAiN diskmag.

Breakpoint 2006 promotion started almost immediately after its precursor, and many sceners who had been avoiding demoparties for years signaled that they would attend. The party organizing team created a "jungle" theme.  The party place was adorned with torches, rocks, skeletons and vines, doors were surrounded with totem pole-like ornaments, speaker stands and other accessories were wrapped in an Inca-esque setting. The party theme revolved around sceners losing their scene spirit and fighting their ways in competitions to retrieve and free them. The event featured the annual Scene.org Awards ceremony in a much more formal and ceremonial setting, and various live acts, including a performance by Welle: Erdball.

Breakpoint 2007 lost one of its major sponsors, ATi, as a result of their merger with AMD (Intel remained a primary sponsor).  To keep a balanced budget, the organizers decided to not only raise the entrance fee to 60 Euros, but to remove the "girls get in free" tradition and charge females equally.  Despite the financial challenges, 2007 featured the usual array of competitions and seminars, including one from the infamous film director, Uwe Boll.  The Scene.org Awards ceremony was restructured with shorter screening times to reduce the show length.  The regular party band, BASS, returned with a slightly revised lineup, and the Danish Commodore revival band Press Play On Tape performed a live set as well.

Breakpoint 2008 added nVidia as a major sponsor and thus was able to lower the entrance fee to 55 Euros. The "big screen" grew again to 70 m² as the organizers acquired two Full HD projectors.

2009: brokepoint 
Breakpoint 2009 lost nVidia as a major sponsor, losing most of its budget and forcing it to ask for public donations under the temporary name "Brokepoint".  They received enough donations to hold a basic demoparty, albeit without some features such as the seminars.  The entrance fee remained 55 euros, and "supporter tickets" were added at 250 euros and up for donors.  Soon before the party began, 20th Century Fox stepped in as a major sponsor to promote the film X-Men Origins: Wolverine.  A special Wolverine Contest was added for demos, videos, art, and music based on the character and film trailer.  While Breakpoint could no longer pay performers, Xerxes, Romeo Knight, and Bendik returned for a free concert.

2010: Like there is no tomorrow 
Breakpoint 2010 was the final Breakpoint event. It had record attendance of more than one thousand visitors. The last day of the party coincided with the launch of the STS-131, which was streamed on the bigscreen before the prizegiving.

Successor 
After it was announced that Breakpoint would cease, rumours were generated about a possible successor for a German Easter-party. After a series of viral teaser videos, the invitation to the official follow-up demoparty called Revision was released, and the party took place in Saarbrücken, largely sharing the same organizing crew as Breakpoint.

Events
 Breakpoint 2003 — (April 18–21)
 Breakpoint 2004 — "The Code Inside" (April 9–12)
 Breakpoint 2005 — "Aliens Ate My Demomaker" (March 25–28)
 Breakpoint 2006 — "Rumble in the Jungle" (April 14–17)
 Breakpoint 2007 — "Demoscene Through Time and Space" (April 6–9)
 Breakpoint 2008 — "Digital Garden" (March 21–24)
 Breakpoint 2009 — "Everything Is Under Control" (April 10–13)
 Breakpoint 2010 — "Like There's No Tomorrow" (April 2–5)

Competition winners

External links

 Official Site
 Breakpoint on :fr:Pouët
 Breakpoint 2006 photos on Slengpung
 Revision: Easter Party, Successor party in Saarbrücken

Invitation demos
 Breakpoint 2003 Invitation Intro - fr-024: welcome to... by Farbrausch
 Breakpoint 2004 Invitation Demo - fr-037: The Code Inside by mfx and Farbrausch
 Breakpoint 2005 Invitation Demo - Aliens Ate My Demomaker by mfx and keWlers
 Breakpoint 2006 Invitation Demo - fr-049 of spirits taken by Farbrausch and Vacuum
 Breakpoint 2007 Invitation Intro - Frameskool by Equinox
 Breakpoint 2008 Invitation Intro - Digital Garden by Rebels
 Breakpoint 2009 Invitation Demo - Everything is Under Control by mfx
 Breakpoint 2010 Invitation Intro - fr-033: like there's no tomorrow by farbrausch

References

Demo parties
Mainz-Bingen
Recurring events disestablished in 2010
2003 establishments in Germany
2010 disestablishments in Germany
Music festivals established in 2003